The Soetardjo Petition was a motion of the Volksraad (a nascent legislative body) of the Dutch East Indies, instigated by the legislator Soetardjo Kartohadikusumo, which was submitted as a petition to Queen Wilhelmina and the Estates General of the Netherlands. The document asked for a conference to be organized with representatives from the Indies and the Netherlands to discuss the desire of Indonesians, within a period of ten years, to be autonomous under Article 1 of the Dutch Constitution as part of a Dutch commonwealth under the Dutch Crown.

The petition had six signatories:
 Soetardjo (Javanese, president of Native Civil Servants Association (PPBB))
 Sam Ratulangi (Minahasan)
 Sayyid Ismail Alatas (representative of the ethnic Arab community)
 I. J. Kasimo (Javanese, president of a Catholic association)
 Ko Kwat Tiong Sia (representative of the ethnic Chinese community)
 Datoek Toemoenggoeng (Minangkabau, PPBB member)

In mid-1936, the petition was approved  by the Volksraad by 26 votes to 20, with 15 abstentions. Six Indonesians voted against it (and eight abstained), but because eight Europeans supported it, the petition was approved.

On November 16, 1938, the petition was rejected by the government in the Netherlands because it was considered that the Indonesians were not yet ready for independence, even within the Dutch commonwealth. This rejection encouraged the nationalist movement in Indonesia to be more radical.

Further reading
 Soerjono and Ben Anderson (1980) On Musso's Return Indonesia, Vol. 29, (April 1980), pp. 59–90
Kartohadikusumo, Setiadi, 1990 Soetardjo : pembuat "petisi Soetardjo" dan perjuangannya Setiadi Kartohadikusumo  Pustaka Sinar Harapan, Jakarta

Notes

References
 
 
 
 
 
 

Dutch East Indies
Indonesian National Awakening
1936 in the Dutch East Indies
1936 documents